Harjot Singh Bains is an Indian politician of AAP from Punjab.
 
He won from Anandpur Sahib Assembly constituency in 2022 Punjab Legislative Assembly election. He is currently Cabinet Minister in Punjab Government. On 19 March 2022 he took oath as the youngest ever cabinet minister in the history of Punjab state by breaking the record of Bikram Singh Majithia.

Biography 
Bains hails from Village Gambhirpur in Shri Anandpur Sahib tehsil, district Ropar of Punjab. His grandfather Late S. Ujjagar Singh Bains was an employee in BBMB Nangal and worked in the construction of Bhakra Nangal Dam and his maternal grandfather Late S. Kabal Singh Dhillon was one of the leading contractors of his time in Nangal.

He did his schooling from Ludhiana and BA LLB Hons. from Punjab University. He has also been to London School of Economics and Political Science for a short course in International Human Rights Law. He is a practicing lawyer in Punjab and Haryana High Court.

He has been part of many social movements and founded a Pan Punjab United Youth Organization at the age of 18. He actively participated in the India Against Corruption movement. He was the founding president of the Aam Aadmi Party in Punjab at the age of 23.

Political career

2017 Punjab assembly election 
In the 2017 Punjab Legislative Assembly election, he was the Aam Aadmi Party candidate to represent the Sahnewal Assembly constituency. He ran as a candidate from Sahnewal in the 2017 assembly elections but was unsuccessful, securing 39,000 votes at the age of 26. He is spokesperson for the Aam Aadmi Party and member of the National Executive of the Aam Aadmi party.

2022 Punjab assembly election 
Mr. Bains won 2022 Punjab assembly elections from Shri Anandpur Sahib constituency by defeating Mr. Rana KP Singh of Congress Party by more than 45,000 votes. The Aam Aadmi Party gained a strong 79% majority in the sixteenth Punjab Legislative Assembly by winning 92 out of 117 seats in the 2022 Punjab Legislative Assembly election. MP Bhagwant Mann was sworn in as Chief Minister on 16 March 2022.

On 14 October 2022, Bains was appointed the AAP Himachal Pradesh in charge, for the 2022 Himachal Pradesh Legislative Assembly election.

Member of Legislative Assembly

Bains was elected as the MLA in the 2022 Punjab Legislative Assembly election.  He represented the Anandpur Sahib Assembly constituency in the Punjab Legislative Assembly.

Cabinet minister
Bains took oath as a cabinet minister along with nine other MLAs on 19 March at Guru Nanak Dev auditorium of Punjab Raj Bhavan in Chandigarh. Eight ministers including Bains who took oath were greenhorn (first term) MLAs.

As a cabinet minister in the Mann ministry, Bains was given the charge of four departments of the Punjab Government:
 Department of Legal & Legislative Affairs
 Department of Mines & Geology
 Department of Jails
 Department of Tourism & Cultural Affairs

Jails minister
In May 2022, Bains announced that the jail superintendents would be held accountable for illegal use of mobile phones inside the jail premises by the inmates. In June 2022, he announced that more than 1000 mobile phones were confiscated since the AAP government came to power in Punjab in February. He announced that the modernization of prisons was ongoing and the recruitment process of 1000 jail wardens was happening to meet the staff shortage in the prison department. He stated that the prison officials in Punjab were committed to transforming jails into real 'sudhar ghars' (correctional facilities). He said that jails no longer provided luxurious facilities as they did in past.

Mines minister
As Minister for mines, Bains introduced stricter regulations for mining. The regulations were designed to impact the sand mafia in Punjab.

Electoral performance

References

21st-century Indian politicians
1990 births
Living people
Punjab, India MLAs 2022–2027
Aam Aadmi Party politicians from Punjab, India
People from Rupnagar district
Mann ministry
Aam Aadmi Party candidates in the 2017 Punjab Legislative Assembly election